The 12455 / 56 Delhi Sarai Rohilla–Bikaner Superfast Express is a Superfast Express train belonging to Indian Railways – Northern Railway zone that runs between Delhi Sarai Rohilla and  in India.

It operates as train number 12455 from Delhi Sarai Rohilla to Bikaner Junction and as train number 12456 in the reverse direction serving the states of Delhi, Haryana, Punjab and Rajasthan.

Coaches

The 12455 / 56 Delhi Sarai Rohilla–Bikaner Superfast Express has 1 AC 1st Class cum AC 2 tier, 2 AC 2 tier, 3 AC 3 tier, 5 Sleeper Class, 5 Unreserved/General and 2 end-on-generator coaches. It does not carry a pantry car 

As is customary with most train services in India, coach composition may be amended at the discretion of Indian Railways depending on demand.

Service

As the average speed of the train is above , as per Indian Railways rules, its fare includes a Superfast surcharge.

Routing

This train is different from the 12458/57 Bikaner–Delhi Sarai Rohilla Superfast Express which is operated by North Western Railways and runs via  utilising ICF coach.

Traction

As the entire route is yet to be fully electrified, a Tughlakabad or Ludhiana-based WDM-2 or WDM-3A locomotive powers the train for its entire journey.

Timings

12455 Delhi Sarai Rohilla–Bikaner Superfast Express leaves Delhi Sarai Rohilla on a daily basis and reaches Bikaner Junction the next day.

12456 Bikaner–Delhi Sarai Rohilla Superfast Express leaves Bikaner Junction on a daily basis and reaches Delhi Sarai Rohilla the next day.

References 

 http://www.tribuneindia.com/2013/20130415/bathinda.htm
 http://www.pib.nic.in/newsite/erelease.aspx?relid=58155

External links

 https://nwr.indianrailways.gov.in/uploads/files/1552564951029-PR%20140319-II.pdf
 https://nwr.indianrailways.gov.in/uploads/files/1409058251093-PR%20260814-I.pdf

Transport in Delhi
Transport in Sri Ganganagar
Transport in Bikaner
Express trains in India
Rail transport in Delhi
Rail transport in Haryana
Rail transport in Punjab, India
Rail transport in Rajasthan